Georg Alexander (born Werner Ludwig Georg Lüddeckens; 3 April 1888 – 30 October 1945) was a German film actor who was a prolific presence in German cinema. He also directed a number of films during the silent era.

Personal life
He was married to the Norwegian actress Aud Egede-Nissen from 1915 to 1924. Their son Georg Richter also became an actor.

Filmography

 Es war einst ein Prinzesschen (1916)
 Der Verräter (1917)
 Das Verhängnis der schönen Susi (1917)
 The Platonic Marriage (1919)
 Die lachende Seele (1919)
 Erblich belastet (1919)
 A Drive into the Blue (1919)
 Zwischen Lachen und Weinen (1919)
 Luxuspflänzchen (1919)
 False Start (1919)
 Indian Revenge (1920)
 Nixchen (1920)
 In the Whirl of Life (1920)
 Lady Hamilton (1921)
 Peter Voss, Thief of Millions (1921, 6 parts)
 His Excellency from Madagascar (1922, 2 parts)
 The Game with Women (1922)
 Miss Rockefeller Is Filming (1922)
 The Girl of the Golden West (1922)
 Lola Montez, the King's Dancer (1922)
 Paradise in the Snow (1923)
 The Woman Worth Millions (1923)
 King of Women (1923)
 Das Milliardensouper (1923)
 The Most Beautiful Woman in the World (1924)
 The Wonderful Adventure (1924)
 Comedians of Life (1924)
 My Leopold (1924)
 The Great Unknown (1924)
 The Gentleman Without a Residence (1925)
 The Adventure of Mr. Philip Collins (1925)
 Jealousy (1925)
 Hussar Fever (1925)
 Accommodations for Marriage (1926)
 Nanette Makes Everything (1926)
 Love is Blind (1926)
 The World Wants To Be Deceived (1926)
 The Mill at Sanssouci (1926)
 The Little Variety Star (1926)
 The Hunt for the Bride (1927)
 The Orlov (1927)
 The Lady with the Tiger Skin (1927)
 Nameless Woman (1927)
 Intoxicated Love (1927)
 The Indiscreet Woman (1927)
 One Plus One Equals Three (1927)
 Venus in Evening Wear (1927)
 The Island of Forbidden Kisses (1927)
 The Dollar Princess and her Six Admirers (1927)
 Leontine's Husbands (1928)
 Six Girls and a Room for the Night (1928)
 Immorality (1928)
 Princess Olala (1928)
 Batalla de damas (1928)
 Flucht vor Blond (1928)
 He Goes Right, She Goes Left! (1928)
 Dyckerpotts' Heirs (1928)
 Mikosch Comes In (1928)
 The Great Adventuress (1928)
 Dyckerpotts' Heirs (1928)
 The Happy Vagabonds (1929)
 Love in the Snow (1929)
 Autobus Number Two (1929)
 His Majesty's Lieutenant (1929)
 What's Wrong with Nanette? (1929)
 Black Forest Girl (1929)
 The Diva (1929)
 The Love Waltz (1930)
 Tenderness (1930)
 The Singing City (1930)
 Money on the Street (1930)
 Marriage Strike (1930)
 Waltz of Love (1930)
 The Right to Love (1930)
 Lieutenant, Were You Once a Hussar? (1930)
 Die Bräutigamswitwe (1931)
 Wiener Liebschaften (1931)
 Let's Love and Laugh (1931)
 Die Fledermaus (1931)
 Marriage with Limited Liability (1931)
 The Opera Ball (1931)
 The Love Express (1931)
  (1931)
 Hooray, It's a Boy! (1931)
 Der verjüngte Adolar (1931)
 The Testament of Cornelius Gulden (1932)
 When Love Sets the Fashion (1932)
 Modern Dowry (1932)
 Durchlaucht amüsiert sich (1932)
 The Escape to Nice (1932)
 A Bit of Love (1932)
 The Importance of Being Earnest (1932)
 How Shall I Tell My Husband? (1932)
 Mamsell Nitouche (1932)
 The Tsarevich (1933)
 Madame Wants No Children (1933)
 And Who Is Kissing Me? (1933)
 Love Must Be Understood (1933)
 Our Emperor (1933)
 A Woman Like You (1933)
 Ist mein Mann nicht fabelhaft? (1933)
 The English Marriage (1934)
 The Flower Girl from the Grand Hotel (1934)
 Gypsy Blood (1934)
 The Double (1934)
 Tales from the Vienna Woods (1934)
 The Bird Seller (1935)
 Alles hört auf mein Kommando (1935)
 The Old and the Young King (1935)
 Ein falscher Fuffziger (1935)
 Der Schlafwagenkontrolleur (1935)
 Ein Mädel aus guter Familie (1935)
 Leutnant Bobby, der Teufelskerl (1935)
 Dance Music (1935)
 An Ideal Husband (1935)
 Escapade (1936)
 Rendezvous in Wien (1936)
 Martha (1936)
 Donaumelodien (1936)
 Girls in White (1936)
 Das Frauenparadies (1936)
 The Castle in Flanders (1936)
 Adventure in Warsaw (1937)
 Eine Nacht mit Hindernissen (1937)
 Krach und Glück um Künnemann (1937)
 Die Fledermaus (1937)
 Carousel (1937)
 Zweimal zwei im Himmelbett (1937)
 Hahn im Korb (1937)
 Kleiner Mann – ganz groß! (1938)
 Gastspiel im Paradies (1938)
 Geld fällt vom Himmel (1938)
 Unsere kleine Frau (1938)
 The Deruga Case (1938)
 The Woman at the Crossroads (1938)
 The Girl of Last Night (1938)
 Heimat (1938)
 Mia moglie si diverte (1938)
 Verliebtes Abenteuer (1938)
 Linen from Ireland (1939)
 The Wise Mother in Law (1939)
 Der arme Millionär (1939)
 Woman at the Wheel (1939)
 Wenn Männer verreisen (1940)
 Der Kleinstadtpoet (1940)
 Das himmelblaue Abendkleid (1941)
 Oh, diese Männer (1941)
  (1941)
 Women Are Better Diplomats (1941)
 What Does Brigitte Want? (1941)
 Ein Zug fährt ab (1942)
 Abenteuer im Grandhotel (1943)
 ...und die Musik spielt dazu (1943)
 Die beiden Schwestern (1943)
 The Woman of My Dreams (1944)
 The Master Detective (1944)

Bibliography
 Hardt, Usula.i to California: Erich Pommer's Life in the In

External links

Georg Alexander at Virtual History

1888 births
1945 deaths
German male film actors
German male silent film actors
Actors from Hanover
20th-century German male actors
German film directors
Film people from Hanover